Robert Hessen (born 1936) is an American economic and business historian. He is a  professor at the Graduate School of Business at Stanford University and a senior research fellow at Stanford's Hoover Institution. He is an Objectivist and has authored several books, analyzing business and economic issues from an Objectivist perspective.

Early life and education
Robert Hessen was born in New York City. He received his Bachelor of Arts from Queens College, his Master of Arts from Harvard University, and then his Doctor of Philosophy from Columbia University.

Career

Prior to joining the Hoover Institution and taking his current position at Stanford, he taught at the Graduate School of Business at Columbia University.

He was associated with philosopher Ayn Rand for 25 years, contributed articles to two of her periodicals, as well as her book, Capitalism: The Unknown Ideal. He was a featured commentator on Milton Friedman's award-winning PBS television documentary series, Free to Choose.

In 1985, Hessen became one of the founding board of governors of the Ayn Rand Institute.

Among the books he has written are Steel Titan: The Life of Charles M. Schwab and In Defense of the Corporation. He is also the editor of the multi-volume series Hoover Archival Documentaries. He has featured shorter works in such diverse publications as The New York Times, Barron's, Business History Review, Labor History, The Hastings Law Journal and the Journal of Law and Economics. His essays, discussing capitalism and presenting a private-property-and-contractual model of corporations, were published in the Fortune Encyclopedia of Economics and the Concise Encyclopedia of Economics.

Publications

Book reviews
 Review of Economics in One Lesson, by Henry Hazlitt. The Objectivist Newsletter (February 1962).
 Review of Western Technology and Soviet Economic Development, 1917 to 1930, by Antony C. Sutton. The Objectivist, vol. 9, no. 1 (January 1970), pp. 9-15. Published and edited by Ayn Rand.

References

External links
Biographical profile at the Hoover Institution

Columbia University alumni
21st-century American historians
21st-century American male writers
Economic historians
Objectivism scholars
Harvard University alumni
Stanford University Graduate School of Business faculty
Objectivists
Living people
1936 births
Ayn Rand Institute
American male non-fiction writers